The 1936 United States presidential election in South Carolina was held on November 3, 1936. The state voters chose 8 electors to the Electoral College, who voted for president and vice president. With Roosevelt winning  98.57% of the vote, this was the most emphatic win for any presidential candidate against another in American history.

South Carolina voted for Democratic Party candidate and incumbent President Franklin D. Roosevelt, over Republican Party candidate incumbent Governor of Kansas Alf Landon. Roosevelt carried all counties with over 90% of the vote, with Horry and Lancaster counties being carried unanimously, and his 98.57% of the popular vote is the highest for any presidential candidate in South Carolina since a popular vote was first used in 1868, or for any presidential candidate in any state with an opponent.

Background
At the time of the 1936 election, the Democratic machine had been dominant in South Carolina politics for decades. The state's Republican organizations were marginal, serving mostly to distribute patronage when a Republican president made federal appointments within the state. The South Carolina Republican Party had been led by "Tieless" Joe Tolbert since the late 1890s. However, in the early 1930s, the state party split between two factions: a racially exclusive all-white group led by J.C. Hambright, and Tolbert's group, which included some African-Americans. At the 1932 Republican National Convention, Hambright was seated as the leader of South Carolina's delegation, but at the 1936 convention, Tolbert's authority was restored.

The schism between the two Republican factions extended to the 1936 presidential ballot. At that time, voters were presented with lists of electors nominated by each state party, rather than the names of the presidential and vice-presidential candidates themselves. As a result, two separate slates of Republican electors were nominated, one led by Hambright and the other by Tolbert's nephew Joseph A. Tolbert, and the state's already minuscule Republican vote was split between them. However, ballots in Allendale County, Colleton County, and Edgefield County counties listed only the Tolbert ticket as the slate of the Republican Party. The votes for Landon are presented here as a fusion of the two slates.

Results

Results by county

Notes

References

South Carolina
1936
1936 South Carolina elections